Rule Dance Hall is an album by the Jamaican reggae musician Bunny Wailer. It was released in 1987 via Shanachie Records.

Production
The album was made with the Roots Radics band. Rule Dance Hall contains cover versions of Sam Cooke's "Saturday Night" and the Wailers' "Stir It Up".

Critical reception

AllMusic wrote that "Bunny is in top form to deliver a set of old-school-tempo tunes intent on teaching the newer generation a musical history lesson." The State called the album Wailer's "most successful outing in years," writing that he's "returned to the heavy drums and bass rhythms that are prevalent in the Jamaican dance halls." Stephen Davis, in The Reggae & African Beat, called the album "as brilliant as anything Bob Marley ever did." High Fidelity wrote that it celebrates "the lighter, good-times nature of Jamaica's music."

Track listing

References

Bunny Wailer albums
1987 albums